Khangchendzonga National Park, also Kanchenjunga Biosphere Reserve, is a national park and a biosphere reserve located in Sikkim, India. It was inscribed to the UNESCO World Heritage Sites list in July 2016, becoming the first "Mixed Heritage" site of India. It was included in the UNESCO Man and the Biosphere Programme.

Human history

There are a few Lepcha tribal settlements inside the park.

The park contains Tholung Monastery, a gompa located in the park's buffer zone. It is considered one of the most sacred monasteries in Sikkim.

Geography

The Kanchenjunga Park is situated in the Mangan district and Gyalshing districts in the Indian state of Sikkim. It is one of the few high-altitude National parks of India and was recently included as a mixed-criteria UNESCO World Heritage site.

In the north it adjoins the Qomolangma National Nature Preserve in Tibet, and in the west the Kanchenjunga Conservation Area in Nepal.

Climate
Snowfall is heavy during the winter months and monsoon showers occur from May to mid-October.

Flora
The vegetation of the park include temperate broadleaf and mixed forests consisting of oaks, fir, birch, maple, willow. The vegetation of the park also includes Alpine grasses and shrubs at higher altitudes along with many medicinal plants and herbs.

Fauna
The park contains many mammal species including musk deer, Indian leopard, snow leopard, Himalayan tahr, dhole, sloth bear, viverrids, Himalayan black bear, red panda, Tibetan wild ass, Himalayan blue sheep, mainland serow, goral and takin, as well as reptiles including rat snake and Russell's viper.

A 2014 study revealed that the dhole has become very rare in the area. The wild dogs in the Khangchendzonga Biosphere Reserve are thought to belong to the rare and genetically distinct subspecies C. a. primaevus.

Avifauna
About 550 species of birds are found inside the park including blood pheasant, satyr tragopan, osprey, Himalayan griffon, lammergeier, Western tragopan, green pigeon, Tibetan snowcock, snow pigeon, impeyan pheasant, Asian emerald cuckoo, sunbird and eagle. A new species of bird named Himalayan thrush has been found in 2016. Its scientific name is Zoothera salimalii.

Park specific activities

Trekking
Most of the trekking routes start from Yuksom ( from Gangtok) in West Sikkim. Necessary Permit can be obtained from the Wildlife Education and Interpretation center at Yuksom or from the check post. State Tourism Department along with other travel agents organize treks to Dzongri and other places. The popular trek routes are: 
Yuksom - Tshoka - Dzongri
Bakim - Dzongri - Thangshing - Samuteng - Goechala
Dzongri Base Camp - Rathong – Khangerteng
Thangshing - Lam Pokhari - Kasturi Orar - Labdang - Tashiding

Another popular trekking point includes a path to the Green Lake with Lachen, a village in North Sikkim as the starting point. 
Foreign nationals require a restricted area permit from the Ministry of Home Affairs, Government of India, Delhi to visit the park and the associated region. Indian nationals are required to obtain an Inner Line Permit from the State Home Department. Permission of the State Chief Wildlife Warden is also mandatory for everybody visiting the park.
The important and popular routes are: 
Lucanes Jakchen-Yabuk-Rest Camp (Marco Polo Camp) - Green Lake
Lachen-Thasngu - Muguthang - Thay La - Khyoksa La - Rest Camp - Green Lake.
Most of these trekking routes pass through the Kanchenjunga National Park and is shown in the film Singalila in the Himalaya

Transport
Nearest airport:
Pakyong Airport, a Greenfield project near Gangtok
Bagdogra Airport, Darjeeling district, West Bengal 
Gangtok Helipad, East Sikkim district, Sikkim
Nearest railhead: New Jalpaiguri, Siliguri Junction
Nearest highway: NH 31A (Sevok – Gangtok)
Nearest town: Yuksom in West and Chungthan in North
Nearest city: Gangtok

References

External links

 Khangchendzonga National Park, WebIndia123
 Goecha La: In search of Kangchenjunga by George Thengummoottil - documentary on Goechala Trek inside Kangchenjunga National Park
 

National parks in Sikkim
Protected areas established in 1977
Mangan district
Protected areas of Sikkim
World Heritage Sites in India
1977 establishments in Sikkim